The Largesse of the Sea Maiden: Stories is a 2018 short story collection by Denis Johnson. It was published posthumously on January 16, 2018, by Random House. It consists of five short stories, three of which were previously published in The New Yorker and Playboy. Johnson finished the collection a few weeks before his death in May 2017.

The book was a finalist for the 2018 National Book Critics Circle Award for Fiction.

Contents
"The Largesse of the Sea Maiden"
"The Starlight on Idaho"
"Strangler Bob"
"Triumph Over the Grave"
"Doppelgänger, Poltergeist"

Publication history
Of the five stories in The Largesse of the Sea Maiden, three already appeared in print:

"The Largesse of the Sea Maiden" was originally published in the March 3, 2014, issue of The New Yorker magazine.

"The Starlight on Idaho" was originally published in different form in the February 2007 issue of Playboy magazine.

"Strangler Bob" was originally published posthumously in the October 23, 2017, issue of The New Yorker.

The other two stories in the collection, "Triumph Over the Grave" and "Doppelganger, Poltergeist" appeared for the first time in the collection The Largesse of the Sea Maiden.

Johnson completed works in The Largesse of the Sea Maiden while he was dying of liver cancer in 2017. The collection was published posthumously by Random House on January 16, 2018.

Audiobook
For the audiobook, each of the five stories was read by a different actor. "The Largesse of the Sea Maiden" is read by Nick Offerman, "The Starlight on Idaho" by Michael Shannon, "Strangler Bob" by Dermot Mulroney, "Triumph Over the Grave" by Will Patton, and "Doppelgänger, Poltergeist" by Liev Schreiber.

Reception
At the review aggregator website Book Marks, which assigns individual ratings to book reviews from mainstream literary critics, the collection received a cumulative "Rave" rating based on 38 reviews: 31 "Rave" reviews, 6 "Positive" reviews, and 1 "Mixed" review.

Publishers Weekly gave the collection a rave review, deeming it "an instant classic" and calling it "a masterpiece of deep humanity and astonishing prose."

Maureen Corrigan of NPR praised the collection, singling out "The Largesse of the Sea Maiden" and "Doppelgänger, Poltergeist" as "out-of-this-world" and concluding that the collection "contains the kind of work every writer would like to go out on: fresh, profound and singular. It affirms literature's promise to believers, the gift of eternal voice."

Critical assessment
The posthumous publication of Johnson's second collection of short stories elicited both critical praise and regret at the author's passing. Gavin Corbett of The Irish Times welcomed The Largesse of the Sea Maiden as "a major event in American letters."

Sandy English of the World Socialist Web Site regarded the collection as "perhaps Johnson's best work" in which the themes "responded, in his own way, to the changes in American life in the last quarter century."

Novelist Jim Lewis in The New York Times remarked upon the collection's 19th-century literary antecedents: "ravishing, painful; as desolate as Dostoevsky, as passionate and terrifying as Edgar Allan Poe".

William Giraldi of The Washington Post placed Johnson among the masters of 20th-century short story writers: "Ernest Hemingway, Flannery O'Connor and Raymond Carver."

Critic Troy Jollimore remarks on the significance of the volume's title:

Theme
Themes that invoke "God" and religion appear as key elements in Johnson's final volume of short stories. Social critic Sandy English writes: "It is not a surprise that mystical and semi-religious elements, always present in Johnson's work, are more pronounced in Largesse of the Sea Maiden." Johnson's narratives in The Largesse of the Sea Maiden emphasize the ineluctable advent of death. 
Author Kevin Zambrano writes: "This grimy religiosity is more in keeping with Jesus' Son, but like every story in The Largesse of the Sea Maiden, it is also fixated on death. The narrator believes he can defy it, which scans as more crazy chatter, but isn't belief in eternal life the crux of Christianity?" Author David L. Ulin comments on themes that address "mortality" in Johnson's final literary work:

Critic Aaron Thier defines the literary function of "God" in Johnson's The Largesse of the Sea Maiden:

Comparison-Contrast: Jesus' Son and The Largesse of the Sea Maiden
Johnson's short story oeuvre is represented in two collections: Jesus' Son (1992), comprising 11 works of short fiction, and his Largess of the Sea Maiden (2018), published posthumously 25 years after his first collection, and containing 5 stories. The volumes have elicited commentary by a number of critics on their respective styles and themes. Author David L. Ulin argues that the collections defy comparison.

The stories in both collections are written exclusively from the  first-person point-of-view. While the pieces in Jesus' Son are told by the same youthful narrator, a drug addict identified as "Fuckhead", The Largesse of the Sea Maiden presents a number of unique narrators.  Several settings and characters appear in both collections. Critic Kevin Zambrano notes that "like "Beverly Home," "The Starlight on Idaho" takes its name from a rehab clinic, and Dundun, a character from Jesus' Son, reappears in "Strangler Bob" as part of a triad of jailhouse companions" in The Largesse of the Sea Maiden.

Three of the stories in the 2018 collection diverge from Jesus' Son in that Johnson presents "aging bourgeois professionals, dislocated less from society...Gone are flying women, flowers from Andromeda, crazy explanations for everything. What's left is a vast sense of bewilderment." Social critic Sandy English offers a similar assessment:

Stylistically, Johnson maintains the same excellence in crafting his sentences. Critic Anthony Domestico writes: "The main thing linking The Largesse of the Sea Maiden to Jesus's Son are his sentences...it's the sentences—those adamantine, poetic sentences—that made him one of America's great and lasting writers. It's the sentences that live on." Geoff Dyer admires "the slipshod magnificence and crazy wonder of the Johnsonian sentence. Clause by clause, word by word, anything becomes plausible."

Kevin Zambrano qualifies his praise for Johnson's sentence structure: "More dissimilar than the collections' subject matter are their styles. Despite the greater length of the new stories [in The Largesse of the Sea Maiden], Johnson's sentences have grown more economical, even prosaic." Zambrano suggests that Johnson has traded "brilliance" for "profundity" in these final stories.

Footnotes

Sources 
 
 
 
 
 
 
 
 

2018 short story collections
Short story collections by Denis Johnson
Random House books
American short story collections
Books published posthumously